Social pedagogy describes a holistic and relationship-centred way of working in care and educational settings with people across the course of their lives. In many countries across Europe (and increasingly beyond), it has a long-standing tradition as a field of practice and academic discipline concerned with addressing social inequality and facilitating social change by nurturing learning, well-being and connection both at an individual and community level. The term 'pedagogy' originates from the Greek pais (child) and agein (to bring up, or lead), with the prefix 'social' emphasising that upbringing is not only the responsibility of parents but a shared responsibility of society. Social pedagogy has therefore evolved in somewhat different ways in different countries and reflects cultural and societal norms, attitudes and notions of education and upbringing, of the relationship between the individual and society, and of social welfare provision for its marginalised members. Social pedagogues (professionals who have completed a qualification in social pedagogy) work within a range of different settings, from early years through adulthood to working with disadvantaged adult groups as well as older people. To achieve a holistic perspective within each of these settings, social pedagogy draws together theories and concepts from related disciplines such as sociology, psychology, education, philosophy, medical sciences, and social work.

Methods 
Hämäläinen points out that social pedagogy is not a method or a set of methods, but that any method is chosen based on social pedagogical considerations. In the past 3 main methods were defined:

 Individual case work – with the aim to improve/develop individual life circumstances,
 Social group work – with the aim of developing social competences,
 Community intervention work – with the aim to develop social demographic structures.
After 1970 a lot of different methods derived from those three. In practice a mono-methodical approach can be barely found; approaches/ concepts of action predominate which include more than the three classic methods.

Principles 
Social pedagogy is based on humanistic values stressing human dignity, mutual respect, trust, unconditional appreciation, and equality, to mention but a few. It is underpinned by a fundamental concept of children, young people and adults as equal human beings with rich and extraordinary potential and considers them competent, resourceful and active agents.

In their earlier work on social pedagogy, Petrie et al. identify 9 principles underpinning social pedagogy:
 "A focus on the child as a whole person, and support for the child’s overall development;
 The practitioner seeing herself/himself as a person, in relationship with the child or young person;
 Children and staff are seen as inhabiting the same life space, not as existing in separate hierarchical domains;
 As professionals, pedagogues are encouraged constantly to reflect on their practice and to apply both theoretical understandings and self-knowledge to the sometimes challenging demands with which they are confronted;
 Pedagogues are also practical, so their training prepares them to share in many aspects of children’s daily lives and activities;
 Children’s associative life is seen as an important resource: workers should foster and make use of the group;
 Pedagogy builds on an understanding of children’s rights that is not limited to procedural matters or legislated requirements;
 There is an emphasis on team work and on valuing the contribution of others in 'bringing up' children: other professionals, members of the local community and, especially, parents.
 The centrality of relationship and, allied to this, the importance of listening and communicating."

Eichsteller & Holthoff suggest that social pedagogy aims to achieve:
 Holistic education – education of head (cognitive knowledge), heart (emotional and spiritual learning), and hands (practical and physical skills);
 Holistic well-being – strengthening health-sustaining factors and providing support for people to enjoy a long-lasting feeling of happiness;
 To enable children, young people as well as adults to empower themselves and be self-responsible persons who take responsibility for their society;
 To promote human welfare and prevent or ease social problems.
They go on to describe social pedagogical practice as a holistic process creating a balance between:
 the professional: (theory and concepts, reflective practitioner – the ‘head’)
 the personal: (using one's personality, positive attitude, building personal relationships, but keeping the ‘private’ out – the ‘heart’)
 the practical: (using certain methods and creative activities – the ‘hands’)
All three elements are equal and complement each other, thus generating synergy.

Historic development 
Although pedagogy varies across European countries, there are similar roots that have developed into differing strands of contemporary thinking in pedagogy. Hämäläinen explains that “historically, social pedagogy is based on the belief that you can decisively influence social circumstances through education” – and importantly, education is seen as a lifelong learning process that does not only refer to children but includes educating adults, for instance in order to change their idea of children. 
While philosophers of Classical antiquity like Plato and Aristotle discussed how education could contribute to social development, social pedagogy in theory and practice only emerged through the influence of modern thinking in the Renaissance, the Reformation and later during the Enlightenment, when children started to come into the picture of social philosophy.

Jean-Jacques Rousseau 

A major impetus for the current understanding of pedagogy was the educational philosophy of the Swiss social thinker Jean-Jacques Rousseau (1712–1778).  Concerned with the decay of society, he developed his theories based on his belief that human beings were inherently good as they were closest to nature when born, but society and its institutions corrupted them and denaturalized them.  Consequently, bringing up children in harmony with nature and its laws so as to preserve the good was central for Rousseau's pedagogic theory.  Rousseau innovatively “argued that the momentum for learning was provided by the growth of the person (nature) – and that what the educator needed to do was to facilitate opportunities for learning,” as Doyle and Smith note.

Johann Heinrich Pestalozzi 

Rousseau's educational philosophy inspired ensuing pedagogues, notably Johann Heinrich Pestalozzi (1746–1827), who refined Rousseau's thoughts by developing a method of holistic education, which addressed head, heart, and hands.  These three elements are inseparable from each other in Pestalozzi's method and need to be kept in harmony.  "Nature forms the child as an indivisible whole, as a vital organic unity with many sided moral, mental, and physical capacities.  Each of these capacities is developed through and by means of the others," Pestalozzi stated.

New Education Movement 

Pestalozzi's ideas sparked interest across continental Europe, and particularly the New Education Movement transferred his pedagogic concept into various settings, such as kindergarten (Fröbel), school (Montessori, Steiner, Hahn), residential care (Korczak), and informal work with children and young people (Montessori).  Thus the New Education Movement contributed to a continental pedagogic discourse, which saw children being conceptualised as equal human beings ("Children do not become humans, they already are", Korczak), and as competent, active agents ("A child has a hundred languages", Malaguzzi).  Furthermore, there was increasing recognition for child participation and children's rights, for instance in the pedagogic concepts of Montessori and Korczak.
The New Education Movement led to a spread of pedagogic concepts and ideas across many European countries and made two fundamental points which demonstrate its ambition to use pedagogy for social change: “First, in all education the personality of the child is an essential concern; second, education must make for human betterment, that is for a New Era”.

Alleviating poverty 

Based on the educational ideas of Rousseau, Pestalozzi and Fröbel, the German headteacher Friedrich Diesterweg (1790—1866) emphasised the social relevance of pedagogy in fighting social inequalities. For him social pedagogy was "educational action by which one aims to help the poor in society". Through the contribution of Diesterweg and other thinkers, such as Friedrich Schleiermacher, pedagogy took on a more social role, one of community education that also occurs in later writers like Paulo Freire and John Dewey.
Although pedagogy was early on concerned with changing social conditions through education – Rousseau is most famous for his Social Contract (1762) – its primary focus had been on the individual and his or her upbringing, which Rousseau had aimed to protect from the negative influences of society. Pedagogic thinkers like Pestalozzi and later on Montessori followed in his tradition of developing a child-centred pedagogy, which was increasingly criticised by an emerging school of thought that promoted a pedagogy focused on the collective, on the community and how to use pedagogic ideas for social betterment – or a social pedagogy, as the German educationalist Karl Mager had written in 1844 for the first time.

Social pedagogy 

One of the first key thinkers, Paul Natorp, “claimed that all pedagogy should be social, that is, that in the philosophy of education the interaction of educational processes and society must be taken into consideration”,. His social pedagogic theories were influenced by Plato’s doctrine of ideas, together with Immanuel Kant’s categorical imperative of treating people as subjects in their own rights instead of treating them as means to an end, and Pestalozzi’s method. 
In the 1920s, with influential educationalists such as Herman Nohl, German social pedagogy was interpreted from a hermeneutical perspective, which acknowledged that an individual’s life and their problems can only be understood through their eyes and in their social context, by understanding how the individual interacts with their social environment. 
Following World War II and the experiences within National Socialism that exposed the dangers of collective education in the hands of a totalitarian state, social pedagogy “became more critical, revealing a critical attitude towards society and taking the structural factors of society that produce social suffering into consideration”. Consequently, contemporary social pedagogy in Germany is as a discipline linked more closely to social work and sociology than to psychology.
Due to different historical developments and cultural notions, social pedagogy has very different traditions in other countries, although these are connected through the overarching core principles of social pedagogy. And even within one country, there is not the pedagogic approach – within the general discipline pedagogy we can distinguish various approaches. Some of these are named after key thinkers like Fröbel or Montessori who have created a very specific pedagogic concept for the context of their work, while others are termed according to the medium they are utilising, such as adventure, play, circus, music, or theatre pedagogy.

Qualifying as a social pedagogue 
Similar to other academic disciplines, social pedagogy is a degree-level qualification (higher education) of usually 3.5 years. There are different education routes to qualify as a social pedagogue, which vary from country to country:

Germany 

In Germany social pedagogy and social work have merged into one course – ‘Soziale Arbeit’- since 2007 graduates holding after successful study a double degree: Social Worker and Social Pedagogy.
Social Pedagogy can be studied at Fachhochschule (Universities of applied Sciences) and universities, social pedagogy is offered as Bachelor of Arts (3.5 years) with 1 semester of practical placement as part of the curriculum- Graduates will have the ability to place their professional activity in legal and socio-political perspective and analyse it. The interplay of work experience in their placement and theoretical work in the university prepares the graduates to work with clients, in the field of administration and management of social organisations. For a deeper more research based study Social Pedagogy can be studied after the Bachelor as  Master of Arts (2 years).

Social Pedagogy is  multidisciplinary – the study includes:

 Psychology
 Sociology
 Pedagogy / Education Theory
 Social Work
 Social Management
 Law and Politics
 Professional Concepts such as Mediation, Therapy, Supervision, communication concepts.
 Media
 Economy
 Social Justice
 Health
 Theatre pedagogy

Denmark 

Danish social pedagogues usually qualify at Seminariets (seminariums), which offer 3.5 year courses that include 3 placements in different pedagogic settings throughout the period of studies. Some seminariums also offer short courses on social pedagogy in English. Further studies at MA level often combine social pedagogy with interlinked disciplines, such as social work, sociology or psychology, and can be pursued at several universities.

Czech Republic and Slovakia

Czech and also Slovak social pedagogues usually study at the university level (there is also possibility to study at the college where they will get a DiS. degree). Social Pedagogy is offered as a Bachelor study programme. For research based studies, Social Pedagogy can be studied as Master programme after finishing the bachelor's degree. The academics separate Social Pedagogy from the social work and they look at them as at two separate disciplines.
In Slovakia is Social pedagogy a part of professional network in Educational and psychological centres (as part of school facilities) and also in schools.

North America 

In the United States, Arizona State University's School of Social Transformation offers a master of arts degree in social and cultural pedagogy. The 30-unit program requires 10 three-credit courses. The core courses (9 credits) include Foundations of Social Transformation, Research Methods, and Social and Cultural Pedagogy: Theoretical and Practical Issues. Students complete five elective courses (15 credits) and then either a thesis or a capstone project (6 credits). The program develops students' capacity to analyze non-formal education policies and practices and examine the educational impact of a range of institutions, organizations and associational spaces. It provides training and skills for work in settings such as: adult education, community organizing, literacy programs, museum education, dis/ability programs, youth and sports programs, peace education, environmental education, religious organizations, health education, civic education, Indigenous and tribal communities, for-the-job and on-the-job training. There is also a professional organization, the Social Pedagogy Association (SPA), which was established as a 501(c)3 nonprofit in 2016 by graduates of the social and cultural pedagogy masters program at ASU. The goal of SPA is to encourage and track the growth of social pedagogy in the United States.

United Kingdom
A variety of qualifications are now available in the UK, ranging from a Level 3 qualification to BA programmes to a master's degree. Since February 2017 the Social Pedagogy Professional Association has acted as a professional home for social pedagogy in the UK. As a membership organisation it has developed social pedagogy standards of proficiency and standards for education and training.

Slovenia
In Slovenia social pedagogues usually study at the university level. Social Pedagogy is offered as a Bachelor study programme and as Master programme after finishing the bachelor's degree. The academics separate Social Pedagogy from the social work and they look at them as at two separate disciplines.

See also
 Theatre pedagogy
 Free school movement

References

Further reading 

 Cameron, C. & Moss, P. (2011). Social Pedagogy and Working with Children. London: Jessica Kingsley.
 Charfe, L. & Gardner, A. (2019). Social Pedagogy and Social Work. London: Sage 
 Hatton, K. (2013). Social Pedagogy in the UK: Theory and Practice. Lyme Regis: Russell House.
 Kornbeck, J. & Rosendal Jensen, N. (2009). The Diversity of Social Pedagogy in Europe. Bremen: Europäischer Hochschulverlag.
 Kornbeck, J. & Rosendal Jensen, N. (2011). Social Pedagogy for the Entire Lifespan: Volume I. Bremen: Europäischer Hochschulverlag.
 Kornbeck, J. & Rosendal Jensen, N. (2012). Social Pedagogy for the Entire Lifespan: Volume II. Bremen: Europäischer Hochschulverlag.
 Petrie, P. & Moss, P. (2002). From Children's Services to Children's Spaces. London: Routledge.
 Petrie, P. (2011). Communication Skills for Working with Children and Young People: Introducing Social Pedagogy. London: Jessica Kingsley.
 Stephens, P. (2013). Social Pedagogy: Heart and Head. Bremen: Europäischer Hochschulverlag.
 Storø, J. (2013). Practical Social Pedagogy: Theories, Values and Tools for Working with Children and Young People. Bristol: Policy Press.

Further information
 http://www.internationaljournalofsocialpedagogy.com – the articles in the International Journal of Social Pedagogy reflect the cross-cultural perspectives of a wide range of social pedagogical traditions and provide a greater understanding of social pedagogy in ways that are both relevant at a practice level and contribute to the body of theory and research
 http://www.sppa-uk.org - The Social Pedagogy Professional Association is the professional home for social pedagogy in the UK
 http://www.social-pedagogy.org.uk/spdn/ - The Social Pedagogy Development Network offers a free forum for anyone interested in social pedagogy
 http://www.socialpedagogyuk.com – The official website for social pedagogy in the UK, run by TCRU, NCERCC, Jacaranda Recruitment and ThemPra Social Pedagogy
 http://www.thempra.org.uk – ThemPra Social Pedagogy website for further information on social pedagogy and ThemPra's courses, qualifications and systemic change strategies
 http://www.jacaranda-development.co.uk – Jacaranda Development website for further information on social pedagogy and Jacaranda's training courses, field trips and consultancy
 http://www.infed.org – The Online Encyclopaedia for Informal Education has various articles on social pedagogy, related themes and key thinkers
 http://www.communitycare.co.uk – Community Care have published both news articles and research reports on social pedagogy over the last few years
 http://www.cypnow.com – Children and Young People Now report regularly on news and developments regarding social pedagogy
 http://www.socmag.net – The International Social Work and Society News Magazine brings together news from practice in the social sector across the globe, with the 7th edition including an article on the developments around social pedagogy in the UK
 http://www.socialpedagogy.org - The Social Pedagogy Association of the United States, dedicated to the growth and development of social pedagogy in the United States

Alternative education